Gymnastics at the 2007 Pan American Games consisted of three separate sets of events – artistic gymnastics, rhythmic gymnastics, and trampoline gymnastics.

Medal table

Medalists

Artistic gymnastics

Men's events

Women's events

Rhythmic gymnastics

Individual

Group

Trampoline

Men's artistic gymnastics

Team competition

All-around

Floor exercise

Horizontal bar

Parallel bars

Pommel horse

Rings

Vault

Women's artistic gymnastics

Team competition

Individual all-around

Balance beam

Floor exercise

Uneven bars

Vault

See also
Pan American Gymnastics Championships
South American Gymnastics Championships
Gymnastics at the 2008 Summer Olympics

References
gym-score-depot

Pan American Games
2007
Events at the 2007 Pan American Games
International gymnastics competitions hosted by Brazil